Devin Leary (born September 10, 1999) is an American football quarterback for the Kentucky Wildcats of the Southeastern Conference (SEC). Leary previously played for the NC State Wolfpack.

High school career
Leary attended Timber Creek Regional High School in Gloucester Township, New Jersey. During his high school career he set the state record for career passing yards (9,672) and passing touchdowns (117). During his junior year, he set the state record for passing yards (3,688) and touchdowns in a season (48). He was the New Jersey Gatorade Football Player of the Year in 2016 and 2017. Leary committed to North Carolina State University to play college football.

College career
Leary redshirted his first year at NC State in 2018. In 2019, he opened the season as a backup before starting the final five games of the season. He completed 101 of 210 passes for 1,219 yards, eight touchdowns and five interceptions. As a sophomore in 2020, he played in only four games before suffering a broken fibula. He completed 66 of 110 passes for 890 yards, eight touchdowns and two interceptions. Leary entered 2021 as the starting quarterback. On December 5, 2022, after a season cut short by a pectoral muscle injury, Leary entered the NCAA transfer portal. On December 20, several media outlets reported that Leary had committed to Kentucky.

Statistics

References

External links

NC State Wolfpack bio

Living people
Players of American football from New Jersey
American football quarterbacks
NC State Wolfpack football players
People from Gloucester Township, New Jersey
1999 births
Kentucky Wildcats football players